was a naval architect, vice admiral in the Imperial Japanese Navy, entrepreneur and cabinet minister in the pre-war Empire of Japan.

Background
Godō was born in Tokyo to an ex-medical doctor (goten-i) family. He graduated from Tokyo Imperial University in 1901 with a degree in naval engineering, and was accepted into the Imperial Japanese Navy’s Engineering Department. He rapidly rose through the ranks, serving as a military attaché to the United Kingdom as a lieutenant commander from June 1911 to July 1913, and to the United States as a captain from May 1917 to January 1918, and June 1919 to June 1920. He was promoted to rear admiral in December 1922 and became commandant of Kure Naval Arsenal in June 1924. In December 1926, he was promoted to vice admiral.

In 1928, Godō left the navy to accept the post of president of Showa Steel Works, based in Anshan, Manchuria, and the following year became one of the directors of the South Manchurian Railway Company.
In 1937, Prime Minister Senjūrō Hayashi asked that Godō accept both the posts of Minister of Commerce and Industry and Railway Minister. He was also granted a seat in the House of Peers in the Diet of Japan.
In 1938, he became chairman of both the Japan Chamber of Commerce and Industry and the Tokyo Stock Exchange. He led a Japanese trade delegation to Nazi Germany in 1938 to purchase advanced weapons and production machinery, although the German government at the time still strongly favored China in its conflict with Japan. In 1939, Prime Minister Nobuyuki Abe reappointed Godō Minister of Commerce and Industry, and simultaneously Minister of Agriculture and Forestry. He appointed Nobusuke Kishi, then still in Manchukuo, as his Assistant Secretary for Commerce and Industry. In 1942, Godō became chairman of the Japan Management Association. In 1945, he served  as an advisor to the Ministry of Munitions.

After World War II, Godō was apprehended by American occupation authorities along with most members of the pre-war Japanese government under Class A war criminal charges. However, he was subsequently released from Sugamo Prison without coming to trial. He continued to hold the title of chairman of the Japan Management Association after his release.

References
Kudo, Akira.  Japanese-German Business Relations: Co-operation and Rivalry in the Interwar  Period. Routledge (2012) 
Ito, Takeo. Life Along the South Manchurian Railway: The Memoirs of Itō Takeo. M.E. Sharp (1988)

External links
Nishida, People of the Imperial Japanese Navy

Notes

 
 
 
 

1877 births
1956 deaths
People from Tokyo
Government ministers of Japan
Members of the House of Peers (Japan)
University of Tokyo alumni
Imperial Japanese Navy admirals